Raision Loimu is volleyball team from Finland, based in the city of Raisio. The team has played volleyball in Finland's highest level since 1977. During these years Loimu has won six championships, two silver and six bronze medals. The team won the Finland Cup in 2004.

Achievements 

 Finland Champion – 1982, 1983, 1984, 1990, 1997 ja 2001 
 Finland league silver – 1980 ja 1981 
 Finland league bronze – 1978, 1979, 1985, 1987, 1993, 1994, 2010
 Nordic countries champion 2008 
 Finland Cup champion – 2004 
 Finland Cup silver – 2005 
 Champions league – 1998, 2001

History 

Raision Loimu club was founded in 1958. The team rose to the Finland Volleyball league for first time in 1977. After that the team had its first medal season in 1978 with the club earning a bronze medal. Loimu won its first Finland Championship in 1982. After that the team has been Finland Champion six times. They played in the Champions league in 1998 and 2001.

Loimu has had many famous players such as Mikko Oivanen, Matti Oivanen, Simo-Pekka Olli, Tuomas Sammelvuo, Janne Heikkinen, and many others.

Team

Season 2010–2011

Setters:

 Simo-Pekka Olli
 Jani Puputti
 Jose Carrasco (VEN)

Middle blockers:

 Kimmo Kutinlahti
 Henri Tuomi (C)
 Juha-Pekka Mikkola

Outside hitters:

 Jimmy Hernandez
 Ossi Rumpunen
 Eemeli Kouki

Opposite:

 Ronald Jimenez (COL)

Libero:

 Dustin Watten (USA)

Other 

Loimu's audience arithmetic mean in the 2009–2010 season was 721 per game.

Famous players 

 Mikko Oivanen
 Tuomas Sammelvuo
 Janne Heikkinen
 Matti Oivanen
 Diego Bonini
 Jukka Rajakangas
 Kai Rumpunen
 Kari Kalin
 Jussi Jokinen
 Jouni Koskela

See also 
 Finland volleyball league

Finnish volleyball clubs
Raisio
Volleyball clubs established in 1958
1958 establishments in Finland